The bilabial ejective fricative is a rare type of consonantal sound.

Features
Features of the bilabial ejective fricative:

Occurrence

See also
 List of phonetic topics

References

External links
 

Fricative consonants
Ejectives
Oral consonants